Krishnaganj Assembly constituency is an assembly constituency in Nadia district in the Indian state of West Bengal. It is reserved for scheduled castes.

Overview
As per orders of the Delimitation Commission, No. 88 Krishnaganj Assembly constituency (SC) is composed of the following: Krishnaganj community development block, and Badkulla-I, Badkulla-II, Betna Gobindapur, Dakshin Para I, Dakshin Para II, Gajna, Mayurhat I and Mayurhat II gram panchayats of Hanskhali community development block.

Krishnaganj Assembly constituency (SC) is part of No. 13 Ranaghat (Lok Sabha constituency) (SC).

Members of Legislative Assembly

Election results

2021 Assembly Election

2019 By election
In the Krishnaganj seat, the by-election was held due to the murder of the sitting TMC MLA Satyajit Biswas.

2016

2015 By election
In the Krishnaganj seat, the by-election was held due to the death of the sitting TMC MLA Sushil Biswas on 21 October 2014.

2011 General election
In the 2011 election, Sushil Biswas of Trinamool Congress defeated his nearest rival Barun Biswas of CPI(M).

 

.# Swing calculated on Congress+Trinamool Congress vote percentages taken together in 2006.

1977-2006
In the 2006 state assembly elections, Binay Krishna Biswas of CPI(M) won the 88 Krishnaganj (SC) assembly seat defeating his nearest rival Sushil Biswas of Trinamool Congress. Contests in most years were multi cornered but only winners and runners are being mentioned. Sushil Biswas of CPI(M) defeated Bidhan Chandra Poddar of Trinamool Congress/Congress in 2001, 1996 and 1991. Nayan Chandra Sarkar of CPI(M) defeated Mrinal Kanti Biswas of Congress in 1987. Jnanendranath Biswas of CPI(M) defeated Ananda Mohan Biswas of Congress in 1982 and Amulya Kumar Biswas of Janata Party in 1977. Prior to that, the constituency did not exist.

References

Assembly constituencies of West Bengal
Politics of Nadia district